The Federal Accountability Act (full title: An Act providing for conflict of interest rules, restrictions on election financing and measures respecting administrative transparency, oversight and accountability) (the Act) is a statute introduced as Bill C-2 in the first session of the 39th Canadian Parliament on April 11, 2006, by the President of the Treasury Board, John Baird.  The aim was to reduce the opportunity to exert influence with money by banning corporate, union, and large personal political donations; five-year lobbying ban on former ministers, their aides, and senior public servants; providing protection for whistleblowers; and enhancing the power of the Auditor General to follow the money spent by the government.

The bill aimed to increase the transparency of government spending, and establish clearer links between approved expenditures and their outcomes. The bill was passed by the House of Commons on June 22, 2006, by the Senate on November 9, 2006, and was granted royal assent on December 12, 2006.

Provisions
The following are some of the major changes instituted by the Federal Accountability Act:

Auditing and accountability within departments
One of the biggest changes, recommended by the Gomery Commission, was that deputy ministers became "accounting officers", reporting directly to Parliament (thereby bypassing their ministers) on the financial administration of their respective departments.
A mechanism to resolve disputes between ministers and deputy ministers, and to document such resolutions, was also created.

Independent Oversight Offices
A number of new independent oversight offices were created, reporting directly to Parliament on the administration of the government.
The Commissioner of Lobbying replaced the Registrar of Lobbyists as a fully independent office with greater investigative powers.
The Parliamentary Budget Officer provides Parliament with objective analysis about government estimates, the state of the nation's finances, and trends in the national economy.
The Public Sector Integrity Commissioner promotes whistleblowing and protects whistleblowers from negative repercussions in the workplace.
The Office of the Procurement Ombudsman reviews and investigates complaints against government procurement practices.
The Conflict of Interest and Ethics Commissioner administers the Conflict of Interest Code for Members of the House of Commons.

New limits on individual donations to parties and candidates
Prohibition of gifts or other benefits to a candidate for political office that influences or appears to influence the performance of that office if elected.
Individual political contributions limited to $1,100 to different aspects of a single political organization: $1,100 to a registered party; $1,100 to a registered party's candidates, nomination contestants, and constituency associations, collectively; and $1,100 to leadership contestants collectively.
Corporations, unions and organizations were banned from contributing to parties and candidates.
Candidates must report all gifts over $500 to the Chief Electoral Officer.

Lobbying
Senior public officials prohibited from engaging in lobbying for 5 years after their employment has ceased.

Public Appointments Commission
Proposed creation of a Public Appointments Commission to develop guidelines, review and approve the selection processes proposed by Ministers to fill vacancies within their portfolios, and report publicly on the Government's compliance with the guidelines. However, no such commission has yet been created.

Access to information
Increased scope of the Access to Information Act, to cover a number of Crown Corporations, which can now be called upon by the public to disclose their records.

Independent Prosecution
The Public Prosecution Service of Canada was made independent of the rest of the Department of Justice, although the Director of Public Prosecutions still reports to the Minister of Justice.

History

The Federal Accountability Act was the first bill to be tabled by the newly elected Conservative Government. It took about nine months to pass and was significantly amended in the Senate.

The development of the Act was informed by the Conservative Party election platform for the January 2006 election and by Phase 2 of the Gomery Report (Recommendations).

When delivering his sponsor's speech in Parliament, John Baird described it as the "toughest anti-corruption law ever passed in Canada."

Amended legislation

The FedAA is an omnibus legislation - one that amends a number of other statutes. It amended the following: 

 Access to Information Act
 Auditor General Act
 Business Development Bank of Canada Act
 Canada Council for the Arts Act
 Canada Elections Act
 Canada Mortgage and Housing Corporations Act
 Canada Post Corporation Act
 Canada Revenue Agency Act
 Canadian Commercial Corporation Act
 Canadian Dairy Commission Act
 Canadian Race Relations Foundation Act
 Canadian Tourism Commission Act
 Canadian Wheat Board Act
 Cape Breton Development Corporation Act
 Conflict of Interest Act
 Criminal Code
 Department of Justice Act
 Department of Public Works and Government Services Act
 Director of Public Prosecutions Act
 Enterprise Cape Breton Corporation Act
 Export Development Act
 Farm Credit Canada Act
 Federal Courts Act
 Financial Administration Act
 First Nations Fiscal and Statistical Management Act
 Freshwater Fish Marketing Act
 Garnishment, Attachment and Pension Diversion Act
 Government Employees Compensation Act
 Income Tax Act
 Library and Archives of Canada Act
 Lobbying Act (Lobbyists Registration Act)
 Museums Act
 National Arts Centre Act
 National Capital Act
 Non-smokers' Health Act
 Official Languages Act
 Parliament of Canada Act
 Parliamentary Employment and Staff Relations Act
 Pilotage Act
 Privacy Act
 Public Sector Pension Investment Board Act
 Public Servants Disclosure Protection Act
 Public Service Employment Act
 Public Service Superannuation Act
 Radiocommunication Act
 Royal Canadian Mint Act
 Salaries Act
 Standards Council of Canada Act

References

External links
Full text of bill
 Legislative Summary
 Government of Canada's website on the Federal FedAA
 Democracy Watch's Report Card on the Federal Accountability Act

Canadian federal legislation
2006 in Canadian law